Bernard Goumou (born 2 October 1960) is a Guinean politician who serves as the prime minister of Guinea, having been appointed after interim prime minister Mohamed Béavogui became "unavailable due to health reasons".

Biography 
Before entering politics, Goumou served as managing director of Lanala Assurance from 2017.

Political career 
Goumou was appointed as the Minister of Trade, Industry and Small and Medium Enterprises in the transitionary Béavogui government on 27 October 2021.

He was appointed to serve as interim Prime Minister of Guinea after the previous interim prime minister Mohamed Béavogui became "unavailable due to health reasons". His appointment was announced on national television.

References 

1960 births
Living people
Prime Ministers of Guinea
21st-century Guinean politicians